Road to Victory may refer to:
 Road to Victory (1944 film), a short film
 Road to Victory (1941 film), an Australian short documentary

See also
 Victory Road (disambiguation)